The Association of Regional Theatres, Northern Ireland (ART NI), founded in 2003, brings together five regional theatres in Northern Ireland to jointly develop productions touring Northern Ireland, and other theatres in the Republic of Ireland and England.
 The Ardhowen Theatre, Enniskillen
 The Burnavon Arts and Cultural Theatre, Cookstown
 The Market Place Theatre, Armagh
 Millennium Forum, L'Derry
 The University of Ulster's Riverside Theatre, Coleraine

Following the success of their first production, the Irish classic, Philadelphia, Here I Come!, ART NI plans to stage a "classic Irish play" at least once a year.

Productions
 2003-2004 - Brian Friel's Philadelphia, Here I Come!; Adrian Dunbar (director) and Andrea Montgomery (producer for ART NI)
 2006-2007 - Hugh Leonard's Da (running at the Lyric Theatre in Belfast until February 2007)produced by Vincent McCann for Art NI

References

Theatre in Northern Ireland